Bariai may be,

Bariai language
Heteragrion bariai, sp. damselfly